The 2015 World Men's Curling Championship  (branded as Ford World Men's Curling Championship 2015 for sponsorship reasons) was held from March 28 to April 5 at the Scotiabank Centre in Halifax, Nova Scotia, Canada. It marked the first time that a World Curling Championship had been held in Halifax, and the first time that a World Curling Championship event had been held in the province since the World Junior Curling Championships were held in Dartmouth in 1986.

Qualification
The following nations qualified to participate in the 2015 Ford World Men's Curling Championship:
 (host country)
One team from the 2015 USA–Brazil Challenge

Eight teams from the 2014 European Curling Championships

 (winner of the World Challenge Games)
Two teams from the 2014 Pacific-Asia Curling Championships

Teams

WCT ranking
World Curling Tour Order of Merit ranking of national teams (year to date total)

Round-robin standings
Final round-robin standings

Round-robin results
All draw times are listed in Atlantic Daylight Time (UTC−3).

Draw 1
Saturday, March 28, 14:30

Draw 2
Saturday, March 28, 19:30

Draw 3
Sunday, March 29, 9:30

Draw 4
Sunday, March 29, 14:30

Draw 5
Sunday, March 29, 19:30

Draw 6
Monday, March 30, 9:30

Draw 7
Monday, March 30, 14:30

Draw 8
Monday, March 30, 19:30

Draw 9
Tuesday, March 31, 9:30

Draw 10
Tuesday, March 31, 14:30

Draw 11
Tuesday, March 31, 19:30

Draw 12
Wednesday, April 1, 9:30

Draw 13
Wednesday, April 1, 14:30

Draw 14
Wednesday, April 1, 19:30

Draw 15
Thursday, April 2, 9:30

Draw 16
Thursday, April 2, 14:30

Draw 17
Thursday, April 2, 19:30

Tiebreaker
Friday, April 3, 14:30

Playoffs

1 vs. 2
Friday, April 3, 19:30

3 vs. 4
Saturday, April 4, 14:30

Semifinal
Saturday, April 4, 19:30

Bronze medal game
Sunday, April 5, 10:00

Final
Sunday, April 5, 16:00

Statistics

Top 5 player percentages
Round robin only

Perfect games

References
General

Specific

External links

World Men's Curling Championship
World Men's Curling Championship
International sports competitions hosted by Canada
Curling in Nova Scotia
Sport in Halifax, Nova Scotia
World Men's Curling Championship
World Men's Curling Championship
World Men's Curling Championship
Sports competitions in Nova Scotia